Grosse Pointe refers to an affluent coastal area next to Detroit, Michigan, United States, that comprises five adjacent individual cities. From southwest to northeast, they are:

Grosse Pointe Park
Grosse Pointe
Grosse Pointe Farms
Grosse Pointe Shores (incorporated in 2009 from the remnants of two townships: Grosse Pointe Township in Wayne County and Lake Township in Macomb County)
Grosse Pointe Woods

The terms "Grosse Pointe" or "the Pointes" are ordinarily used to refer to the entire area, referencing all five individual communities, with a total population of about 46,000. The Grosse Pointes altogether are 10.4 square miles, bordered by Detroit on the south and west, Lake St. Clair on the east and south, Harper Woods on the west of some portions, and St. Clair Shores on the north. The cities are in eastern Wayne County, except for a very small section in Macomb County. The Pointes begin six miles (10 km) northeast of downtown Detroit and extend several miles northeastward, in a narrow swath of land, to the edge of Wayne County. The name "Grosse Pointe" derives from the size of the area, and its projection into Lake St. Clair.

Grosse Pointe is a suburban area in Metro Detroit, sharing a border with northeast Detroit's historic neighborhoods. Grosse Pointe has many famous historic estates along with remodeled homes and newer construction. Downtown Grosse Pointe, along Kercheval Avenue from Neff to Cadieux, nicknamed "The Village," serves as a central business district for all five of the Grosse Pointes, although each of them (except Grosse Pointe Shores) has several blocks of retail. Downtown Detroit is just over seven miles (11 km) west of this downtown area, accessed by Jefferson Avenue, or several other cross-streets.

The north-south area along Lake St. Clair generally coincides with the boundaries of the two high schools. The southern areas (basically south and west of Moross Road) feature retail districts.

History

Grosse Pointe, recognized for its historic reputation for scenery and landscape, has grown from a colonial outpost and a fertile area for small orchard owners and farmers to a coastal community with prime real estate chosen for grand estates.

The Grosse Pointes were first settled by French farmers in the 1750s after the establishment of the French  Fort Pontchartrain. Members of the British empire began arriving around the time of the Revolutionary War. In the 19th century, Grosse Pointe continued to be the site of lakefront ribbon farms: long narrow farms that each adjoin the lake, useful for irrigation and early transportation needs. Beginning in the 1850s, wealthy residents of Detroit began building second homes in the Grosse Pointe area, and soon afterward, hunting, fishing, and golf clubs appeared. Some grand estates arose in the late 19th century, and with the dawn of the automobile after 1900, Grosse Pointe became a preferred suburb for business executives in addition to a retreat for wealthy Detroiters. By the 1930s, most of the southern and western areas of Grosse Pointe contained established neighborhoods, with remaining gaps and the northern sections such as Grosse Pointe Woods developing after the 1930s.

In 1960, it was revealed that realtors in suburban Grosse Pointe ranked prospective home buyers by using a point system with categories such as race, nationality, occupation, and “degree of swarthiness.” Southern Europeans, Jews, and Poles required higher rankings than Northwestern European people in order to move into the community, while Asians and Blacks were excluded from living in Grosse Pointe altogether. Private detectives were used to investigate potential residents’ backgrounds. The revelation of this practice the state corporation and securities commissioner to issue a regulation to bar the licensing of real estate brokers who discriminated on the basis of race, religion, or national origin. Public hearings brought the national attention to the real estate discrimination situation in Detroit, which resulted in the expansion of open housing activity in the city.

A passenger rail line that connected Detroit to Mt. Clemens along the shore was operational by the late 1890s, making Grosse Pointe more accessible. As the automobile became the primary method of transportation and the rail line was decommissioned, the vista of what became Lake Shore Drive gradually improved. Lakeside estates are accessed from Lake Shore Drive and Jefferson Avenue.

Over the course of the 20th and 21st centuries, Grosse Pointe has gained a reputation as a notable American suburb; entrepreneurial leadership, recreational activities afforded by the Great Lakes waterway, an international border with Canada, and a focus on quality of education contributed to the successful development of the region. The Russell Alger Jr. House, at 32 Lake Shore Dr., serves as the Grosse Pointe War Memorial community center. Grosse Pointe contains fifteen recognized Michigan historical markers.

Culture and contemporary life

"The Village", concentrated along Kercheval Avenue in Grosse Pointe, serves as a central business district for the five Pointes with traditional street-side shopping. The Village has its own Sanders Candy and Dessert Shop, founded by Frederick Sanders Schmidt, who opened a store Detroit in 1875. The Village has become a vibrant district with the emergence of mixed-use developments (more information at the Grosse Pointe page). Grosse Pointe Farms is home to "The Hill" district, located on a small bluff, which includes offices, stores, restaurants and the main branch of the public library. Near its "Cabbage Patch" district, Grosse Pointe Park has retail and restaurants on multiple cross-streets, as well as a farmer's market held weekly during the warm months. Grosse Pointe Woods' main business district lies along one of its main roads, Mack Avenue.

The recreational lifestyle historically associated with Grosse Pointe has given rise to many private clubs. The Country Club of Detroit in Grosse Pointe Farms features a notable classic course, tennis, and traditional amenities. The Grosse Pointe Yacht Club, at the intersection of Vernier Road and Lakeshore Drive on Lake St. Clair, is an acclaimed boating club. The Grosse Pointe Club, also called the "Little Club," is a highly exclusive, historic club on the lakefront, on a site where wealthy Detroiters and Grosse Pointers have gathered for recreation since its organization in 1885, when Grosse Pointe was a cottage-town.  The Lochmoor Club is another club in Grosse Pointe which has an expansive golf course and other amenities.  The Hunt Club is the equestrian club of Grosse Pointe. It houses an impressive number of horses and stables for the suburban area.

Many prominent Detroiters, members of the Ford family, including Edsel Ford (son of Henry Ford) and his wife, Eleanor Clay Ford, as well as Henry Ford II (grandson of Henry Ford), have chosen to reside in Grosse Pointe. The Edsel and Eleanor Ford House, at 1100 Lake Shore Drive, is open to the public for guided tours.

Each city has at least one municipal park along Lake St. Clair. The landlocked Grosse Pointe Woods has its park at the southern tip of St. Clair Shores, adjacent to Grosse Pointe Shores.  Access to each of these parks is restricted to residents of its municipality, causing occasional controversy among residents of both Grosse Pointe and other neighborhoods in Metro Detroit.  Jefferson Avenue, a major thoroughfare in Detroit, becomes Lakeshore Drive between Grosse Pointe Farms and Grosse Pointe Shores, and is the scenic carriageway of all five Grosse Pointes, after skirting the eastern neighborhoods of Detroit. Lakeshore Drive was featured on HGTV's television program Dream Drives and in the films Grosse Pointe Blank and Gran Torino.

The region is home to University Liggett School, Michigan's oldest independent school, and two high schools: Grosse Pointe South High School and Grosse Pointe North High School, which are the termini of the Grosse Pointe Public School System.

Newspapers and community organizations generally serve all five cities, as do the public library and school system, but municipal services are separate. The Grosse Pointe News, on a weekly basis, and the Grosse Pointe Times, on a semi-weekly basis, publish local news, though the Detroit Free Press and The Detroit News provide the majority of regional, national and international news.

Architecture

Grosse Pointe has a significant collection of historic architecture as well as some newer mansions. Albert Kahn designed  the Edsel & Eleanor Ford House (1927) at 1100 Lakeshore Dr. in Grosse Pointe.  Rose Terrace (1934–1976), the mansion of Anna Dodge, once stood at 12 Lakeshore Dr. in Grosse Pointe. Designed by Horace Trumbauer as a Louis XV styled château,  Rose Terrace was an enlarged version of the firm's Miramar in Newport, Rhode Island.  A developer, the highest bidder for Rose Terrace, demolished it in 1976 to create an upscale neighborhood. This gave a renewed sense of urgency to preservationists. The Dodge Collection from Rose Terrace may be viewed at the Detroit Institute of Arts.  The Italian Renaissance styled Russell A. Alger House (1910), at 32 Lakeshore Dr., by architect Charles A. Platt serves as the Grosse Pointe War Memorial. Many noted architects designed works in Grosse Pointe including Albert Kahn, Marcel Breuer, Marcus Burrowes, Chittendon and Kotting, Crombie & Stanton, Wallace Frost, Robert O. Derrick, John M. Donaldson, Louis Kamper, August Geiger, William Kessler, Hugh T. Keyes, George D. Mason, Charles A. Platt, Leonard Willeke, Eliel and Eero Saarinen,  Field, Hinchman, and Smith, William Buck Stratton, and Minoru Yamasaki. Included below are examples of some of Grosse Pointe's many historic structures.

Landmarks

Notable residents

 Gregg Alexander: New Radicals frontman, best known for their single "You Get What You Give"
 Anita Baker: soul singer
 Roy D. Chapin: 457 Lake Shore Drive, Hudson Motor Car Company founder, served as United States Secretary of Commerce. Architect John R. Pope designed the Georgian style Chapin house, built in 1927. In 1956, Henry Ford's grandson Henry Ford II purchased the home.
 Andrea Deck: actress
 Anna Thompson Dodge (Mrs. Horace E. Dodge): 12 Lake Shore; Rose Terrace Mansion was demolished in 1976
 Horace Dodge: automotive pioneer
 John Francis Dodge: automotive pioneer; 80,000+ sq ft home stood vacant for 20 years following his death
 Jeffrey Eugenides: Pulitzer Prize-winning novelist
 Prince Fielder: former Detroit Tiger; grew up in Grosse Pointe Park while his father was playing for the Tigers
 Edsel Ford and Eleanor Clay Ford: 1100 Lake Shore Drive; Edsel was son of Henry Ford; public tours
 Henry Ford II: 160  Rd.; grandson of Henry Ford
 Martha Firestone Ford: owner of the Detroit Lions; granddaughter of Harvey Samuel Firestone
 William Clay Ford: grandson of Henry Ford
 William Clay Ford Jr.: great-grandson of Henry Ford
 Alexander Grant: 18th-century British Great Lakes Naval Commander
 John 5: guitarist and songwriter
 Russell A. Alger: United States Senator, and Secretary of War
 Henry B. Joy: president of Packard Motor Car Company
 Cornelia Groefsema Kennedy: Federal District Court Judge, later appointed to the Sixth Circuit Court of Appeals
 Edie Kerouac-Parker: first wife of Jack Kerouac
 Aaron Krickstein (born 1967): tennis player, world # 6
 George Lothrop: Attorney General of Michigan, and later U.S. Ambassador to Russia
 Kirk Maltby: forward for the Detroit Red Wings
 Stephen Murphy III: Federal District Court Judge; United States Attorney in Detroit
 Serge Obolensky: Russian aristocrat, American paratrooper in WWII, and businessman
 Roger Penske: founder of Penske Automotive Group
 Carly Piper: Olympic swimmer; won gold medal in Athens in 2004 for the 4 × 200 m freestyle relay
 J.K. Simmons: Academy Award winning Actor
 Quinn XCII: Singer and songwriter
 Corey Tropp: forward for the Buffalo Sabres
 Ralph Wilson: owner of the Buffalo Bills; long-time Shores resident
 Meg White: member of The White Stripes; born in Grosse Pointe Farms
 G. Mennen Williams: Governor and Chief Justice of the Michigan Supreme Court
 Marianne Williamson: Democratic candidate for President of the United States of America

Notes

References and further reading
 A&E with Richard Guy Wilson, Ph.D. (2000). America's Castles: The Auto Baron Estates, A&E Television Network.

External links

 Edsel & Eleanor Ford House
 Grosse Pointe Historical Society
 Grosse Pointe Public School System
 University Liggett School
 Grosse Pointe Public Library
 Grosse Pointe News — weekly newspaper
 Grosse Pointey — online news source
 Grosse Pointe War Memorial (Russell Alger mansion)
 The Village, Downtown Grosse Pointe — shopping district

Geography of Michigan
Metro Detroit
Coastal resorts in Michigan
Michigan populated places on Lake St. Clair